PDF Signer is a PDF editor for macOS.
This simple PDF editor was specifically designed to fill and sign PDF documents such as agreements and forms without having to print and scan them. It provides the ability to add text and scanned signature images, scribe a signature using the mouse/trackpad, re-order/rotate/delete pages, save back the edits to the original PDF in the native format, and avoids blowing up the file size so it remains email-friendly.

In 2012, PDF Signer was included in MacHeist bundle IV.

The demo can be downloaded free, and the paid version is available from the site or on the Mac App Store.

See also 
 PDF
 List of PDF software

References

External links

PDF software
MacOS-only software